Richard Michael Forsyth (born 3 October 1970) is an English former professional footballer who played as a midfielder. He made nearly 250 appearances in the Football League playing for Birmingham City, Stoke City, Blackpool, Peterborough United and Cheltenham Town.

Playing career
Forsyth was born in Dudley, Staffordshire (now West Midlands). He began his football career with Stourbridge before joining Kidderminster Harriers in 1987. In eight years with the club he played more than 300 games in all competitions, scoring 71 goals. He was part of the team which won the Conference title in 1993–94, and was the club's leading league scorer for the 1994–95 season with 13 goals, before moving to Birmingham City for a fee of £100,000.

A year later he moved on to Stoke City for a £200,000 fee, where he scored the first League goal in Stoke's new Britannia Stadium, went on to spend three seasons with the club playing more than 100 games in all competitions. His next move was to Blackpool on a free transfer in 1999, and then to Peterborough United, also on a free, where he linked up again with former Birmingham manager Barry Fry. In October 2002, amid financial uncertainty at Peterborough, Forsyth joined Cheltenham Town on a month's loan; on his return to Peterborough, the club expected him to remain with them, but, claiming the player had been "unsettled" by Cheltenham's offer of a longer permanent contract, finally allowed him to join Cheltenham for a fee of £15,000. In January 2003 he sustained a hamstring injury which put paid to the remainder of his season. Released at the end of the 2003–2004 season, Forsyth joined Northwich Victoria on non-contract terms, but within weeks he suffered cruciate ligament damage which would keep him out for the season.

He has since played for Stoke City's Masters team, and for Wolverhampton Casuals and Shawbury United of the West Midlands (Regional) League Premier Division.

After his career in football, he taught physical education at North East Wolverhampton Academy.

Career statistics
Source:

A.  The "Other" column constitutes appearances and goals in the Anglo-Italian Cup, Football League Trophy.

Honours
Kidderminster Harriers
Conference National champions: 1994

References

External links
 
 

1970 births
Living people
Sportspeople from Dudley
English footballers
Association football midfielders
Stourbridge F.C. players
Kidderminster Harriers F.C. players
Birmingham City F.C. players
Stoke City F.C. players
Blackpool F.C. players
Peterborough United F.C. players
Cheltenham Town F.C. players
Northwich Victoria F.C. players
Wolverhampton Casuals F.C. players
Shawbury United F.C. players
English Football League players
National League (English football) players